Ostedes dentata is a species of beetle in the family Cerambycidae. It was described by Pic in 1936.

References

Ostedes
Beetles described in 1936